The Warnowiaceae are a family of athecate dinoflagellates (a diverse group of unicellular eukaryotes). Members of the family are known as warnowiids. The family is best known for a light-sensitive subcellular structure known as the ocelloid, a highly complex arrangement of organelles with a structure directly analogous to the eyes of multicellular organisms. The ocelloid has been shown to be composed of multiple types of endosymbionts, namely mitochondria and at least one type of plastid.

Habitat and life cycle
Warnowiids are found in marine plankton but are very rare in most plankton samples. Little is known about their life histories because they cannot be cultured in the laboratory, and samples obtained from the natural environment do not survive well under laboratory conditions. Studies of wild samples have found evidence of distinctive structures called trichocysts in warnowiid cell vacuoles, suggesting that their prey might be other dinoflagellates. Despite the complexity of the ocelloid, the experimental difficulty of working with the cells has prevented experimental study of light-directed behavior such as phototaxis.

Taxonomy
The family contains eight recognized genera. Descriptions of genera and species within the family have been complicated by complex morphological changes during the life cycle and in response to the environment, and the systematics of this group is not currently well defined.

Subcellular structures
The warnowiids as a group possess unusually complex subcellular structures. The ocelloid light sensitive structure is recognized as a synapomorphic character of warnowiids.

Other complex subcellular structures, such as nematocysts, trichocysts, and pistons, are present in some (but not all) warnowiids and are shared with the polykrikoid dinoflagellates, the closest extant relatives as defined by molecular phylogenetics.

Ocelloid function and origin
The ocelloid of warnowiids functions similarly to eyes found in much larger organisms, containing structures similar to a retina and lens. It is receptive only to the polarized light that is created as light passes through the thecal plates of other dinoflagellates. Because dinoflagellates are the main source of food for warnowiids, this trait is particularly useful for locating prey. 

A gene fragment that is expressed in the rhodopsin of the retinal body of the ocelloid has been shown to be most closely related to those of bacteria, suggesting a bacterial endosymbiont as the origin of the organelle.

Gallery

References

External links
 

Dinoflagellate families
Gymnodiniales